Nicole Camille Richie (born September 21, 1981) is an American television personality, fashion designer, socialite, and actress. She came to prominence after appearing in the reality television series The Simple Life (2003–2007), in which she starred alongside her childhood friend and fellow socialite Paris Hilton. Richie's personal life attracted media attention during the series' five-year run and thereafter.

Following the conclusion of The Simple Life, Richie continued her career in television, appearing as one of the three judges on the reality competition series Fashion Star (2012–2013). She later starred in the unscripted comedy series Candidly Nicole (2014–2015), which ran for two seasons. From 2017 to 2018, Richie starred in her first series regular acting role as Portia Scott-Griffith in the sitcom Great News. In 2020, she became a judge on the reality competition series Making the Cut. In fashion, she is the founder of the lifestyle brand House of Harlow. Richie has also published two novels.

Early life
Nicole Camille Escovedo was born in Berkeley, California. She is of English, Mexican, and Creole African-American descent. Her biological father, Peter Michael Escovedo, is the brother of musician Sheila E. and nephew of guitarist Alejandro Escovedo, and her biological mother is Karen Moss. When she was three years old, her biological parents decided to leave her under the care of Lionel Richie and his first wife Brenda Harvey Richie's family because they could not afford to provide for her. "My parents were friends with Lionel," she told People in 2003. "They trusted that they would be more able to provide for me." Initially, Lionel & Brenda Harvey Richie became her guardians.  His 1986 hit song "Ballerina Girl" was written about Nicole.

Richie and his wife, Brenda Harvey, legally adopted Nicole when she was nine. When Lionel and Brenda went through a bitter public split, they were indulgent to the young Nicole. "Their way of making me happy was to say, 'yes,' to everything I wanted, but I don't think a little girl should have that much freedom," said Richie in a 2006 interview with Vanity Fair. Following the divorce, Lionel remarried and had two more children: Miles (b. 1994) and Sofia (b. 1998). Richie's godmother is Nancy Davis, daughter of Marvin Davis and mother of Brandon Davis. Richie regularly interacted with musicians her father knew, including Michael Jackson (who was her godfather), Prince and Kenny Rogers. Quincy Jones said in a People magazine interview that he has "known Nicole Richie since she was a baby. She's a very smart girl".

Richie graduated from Montclair College Preparatory School in 1999, then attended the University of Arizona in Tucson, Arizona, alongside Kourtney Kardashian and Luke Walton, where she studied Arts and Media. She did not have a definitive study plan in Arizona, dropped out after two years, and returned to California.

Career

Television

In 2003, Richie and her best friend, Paris Hilton, starred in the reality series The Simple Life, in which they lived for a month with a family in the rural community of Altus, Arkansas. The series premiere debuted on Fox on December 2, 2003, to 13 million viewers, increasing Fox's reach among viewers 18–49. The series continued for a second and third season.

Fox subsequently canceled the show after a dispute between Hilton and Richie, but it was aired by E! Entertainment Television for its fourth season, drawing nearly one million viewers and was followed by a relatively unsuccessful fifth season. Complications arose during production of the fifth season, with both Richie and Hilton facing major charges for DUI, and at risk of serving jail time. Hilton was sentenced to 23 days in jail, though this was after production of the season had finished. Richie accepted a plea agreement and was sentenced to four days in jail, again after production had wrapped. Despite talks of a sixth season, the series finished its run at the end of the moderately unsuccessful fifth season.

In 2005, Richie made her acting debut in the comedy film Kids in America. Richie has guest starred in television series including Eve, Six Feet Under, American Dreams, 8 Simple Rules for Dating My Teenage Daughter, and Chuck. Richie appeared as a guest judge during the premiere episode of the seventh season of the reality competition series Project Runway. From 2012 to 2013, she judged the reality competition series Fashion Star. From 2014 to 2015, Richie starred in the unscripted comedy series Candidly Nicole. It is loosely based on Richie's posts on Twitter.

In 2016, Richie was cast as Portia Scott-Griffith, a news anchor, in the sitcom Great News, created by Tracey Wigfield and produced by Wigfield and Tina Fey. The acting role marked Richie's first as a regular on a television series. When speaking about Richie's casting, Fey stated that she was "a really funny person" with "an instant likability" and "good timing without really pushing it." The series premiered on NBC in April 2017. Sonia Saraiya of Variety called Richie's performance "a turn that reveals her substantial comedic talents", while The Washington Posts Emily Yahr highlighted how she "artfully delivers her many one-liners". The series concluded in 2018 after two seasons.

In 2020, she created, executive produced, and starred in digital platform Quibi's series Nikki Fre$h, which chronicles the career of Richie's rapper alter ego of the same name. That same year, she appeared as a judge in the reality competition series Making the Cut.

Writing

In 2005, Richie wrote a semi-autobiographical novel, The Truth About Diamonds, which was released by Bharell Jackson Publishing. The novel is loosely based on her life but is mostly fictional. It chronicles the life of a famous singer's adopted daughter named Chloe Parker, who makes her way through all the popular nightclubs and parties in Hollywood while battling a drug addiction. In early January 2006, The Truth About Diamonds peaked at number No. 32 in Hardcover Fiction on The New York Times Best-Seller List.

Richie's second novel, Priceless, was released on September 28, 2010. It tells the story of a girl who loses everything and then learns about what really matters in life.

Fashion

Richie has been featured in several fashion blogs and magazines such as Harper's Bazaar, Seventeen, Lucky, Marie Claire, Elle, InStyle, Paper, Company, Nylon, Tatler, Flare, and Teen Vogue. She has also modeled for Australia's Vogue and Elle; US' People, Stuff, Blender and Hollywood Reporter; Mexico's Marie Claire and UK's Glamour. Richie has been the face of Bongo Jeans and Jimmy Choo advertising campaigns. In April 2007, Richie announced plans to start a jewelry, accessories, and sunglasses line along with a perfume and style book. In October 2008, she debuted a jewelry line, named House of Harlow. The line became available at Kitson's online boutique. In spring 2010, the line was extended to include apparel and shoes. House of Harlow later became a lifestyle brand including eyewear, home fragrance, and accessories.

In 2009, Richie joined maternity store A Pea in the Pod to create the new collection maternity clothes. The line was titled "Nicole" which had pieces that she would wear as an expectant mother. In February 2010, Richie expanded her fashion business with a women's line called Winter Kate, her daughter's two middle names. The collection was inspired by timeless prints and shapes, beautiful paisley and florals.

In 2010, Richie won "Entrepreneur of the Year" for her House of Harlow brand at the Glamour Women of the Year Awards. House of Harlow was also nominated in the category "Celebrity Fashion Line" at the 2010 Teen Choice Awards. In July 2011, the brand unveiled a 14-piece handbag collection, which became available at Bergdorf Goodman, Neiman Marcus, Nordstrom, and Shopbop. In May 2012, it was reported both Ritchie’s lines, House of Harlow 1960 and Winter Kate reached estimated sales of $55 million combined while Richie only receives 5% of revenues, according to the Hollywood Reporter. She launched a collection for Macy's Impulse line in September 2012, which was sold in 100 Macy's stores as well as online. Her first fragrance, Nicole by Nicole Richie, was also launched in September 2012. Her second fragrance, No Rules by Nicole Richie was launched in March 2014.

In 2017, Richie became Urban Decay's brand ambassador, representing their "Troublemaker" mascara. House of Harlow partnered with Urban Decay for a limited-edition collection in April 2018. The line was exclusively sold at Revolve's official website.

Music
Richie made her musical debut in February 2005 with a live appearance on ABC's The View playing the piano. In 2004, she auditioned for the role of Maureen in the popular Broadway hit Rent but did not get the part. In February 2010, Richie was featured on the charity single "We Are the World 25 for Haiti". In September 2013, Richie made a cameo appearance in Christina Aguilera's music video for the song "Let There Be Love".

Richie stated in April 2020 that she would release a comedy rap album under the moniker Nikki Fre$h; confirmed songs for the album include "Drip Drip", "The Gem Song", and "Bee's Tea". The album, titled Unearthed, was released on August 28.

Personal life

In April 2005, reports surfaced that Richie and longtime friend Paris Hilton were no longer speaking to each other. Hilton commented: "It's no big secret that Nicole and I are no longer friends. Nicole knows what she did, and that's all I'm ever going to say about it". Neither Richie nor Hilton spoke publicly about the cause of the split. They eventually reconciled in October 2006. Richie was in a relationship with DJ Adam Goldstein, which involved an engagement, from 2004 to 2006.

In December 2006, she began dating singer Joel Madden of the rock group Good Charlotte. They have two children, a daughter born in January 2008 and a son born in September 2009. In February 2008, the first photos of their daughter were sold to People magazine for $1 million. The couple confirmed their engagement in February 2010, and married on December 11, 2010. They reside in Los Angeles, California.

Health
In early 2006, Richie was notably thinner compared to her previous appearance in the first two seasons of The Simple Life. In May, she told Vanity Fair, "I know I'm too thin right now, so I wouldn't want any young girl looking at me and saying, 'That's what I want to look like.' She also said, "I started seeing a nutritionist and a doctor. I was scared that it could be something more serious." During this time, it was reported that she had also sought the help of a psychiatrist and a personal trainer. Later that year, in September, Richie stated "I am not anorexic. I am not bulimic. I do not have an eating disorder." On October 27, 2006, it was announced that Richie was seeking treatment for "an inability to put on weight", though it was not for an eating disorder.

In March 2007, Richie was taken to the hospital for dehydration. On March 21, her representatives announced she suffered from hypoglycemia.

Legal issues
In October 2002, Richie was arrested following a brawl in a New York City nightclub. The charges were dropped. In February 2003, she checked herself into a rehabilitation center following her arrest in Malibu, California for driving with a revoked license and possession of heroin. In August, she was sentenced to three years' probation.

On December 11, 2006, Richie was arrested by the California Highway Patrol after she failed a field sobriety test. She was charged with driving under the influence on State Route 134 in the Burbank/Glendale, California area. Several motorists had reported a black Mercedes-Benz G-Class entering the freeway on the exit ramp and traveling in the opposite traffic direction. She admitted to using marijuana and the narcotic Vicodin before the incident. On July 27, 2007, Richie was sentenced to four days in jail at the Century Regional Detention Center in Lynwood, California. However, she only served about 82 minutes of the sentence and was released at 16:37 PDT on August 23, 2007. A spokeswoman for the sheriff's department told People magazine that Richie "was released early due to overcrowding in the jail system." Richie enrolled in an 18-month anti-drinking driver education program the following month, according to papers filed with the Superior Court of California.

In June 2010, Richie's probation was extended one year to March 2011 because she missed her anti-drink driving class. However, Richie's probation was terminated early in December 2010, after her lawyer presented details to the judge that Richie had completed all terms of her probation.

Philanthropy
In November 2007, Richie and her husband Joel Madden created The Richie Madden Children's Foundation in support of disadvantaged young mothers and children. She has been involved with the Red Cross, UNICEF, Elton John AIDS Foundation, Charlize Theron Africa Outreach Project, Dana-Farber Cancer Institute, March of Dimes, Playing for Change, Small Steps Project, and Baby2Baby. Richie is a board member of Baby2Baby.

In 2007, Richie and Madden donated 100 baby gifts to expectant mothers at Los Angeles Free Clinic, through The Richie Madden Children's Foundation. In May 2008, Richie and Madden shot a UNICEF public-service announcement to generate aid for the cyclone-devastated Myanmar. Richie and Madden have also written blogs on the UNICEF website and encouraged people to help children in need. Richie, Joel and Benji Madden along with UNICEF held a fundraiser for the Tap Project in March 2009. They sold 143 water pumps to bring water directly to the villages and raised $100,000. Esprit donated 10% of all the sales on April 2, 2009, at their newly opened 3rd Street Promenade store to The Richie-Madden Children's Foundation. The Richie-Madden Foundation specially designed "Cup with a Cause" for 7-Eleven. It was a part of their charity-focused coffee campaign in February 2010. During 2010 the Foundation worked together with Beyond Shelter, a non-profit organization devoted to providing shelter for homeless families in Los Angeles.

Richie has been a board member of the Environmental Media Association for several years and took part in their awareness program in May 2009. Each member "adopted" a school to raise awareness for the program and help students with environmental education. She also participated in a charity hand-me-downs auction that started on the website handmedowns.com. The proceeds went directly to The Richie Madden Children's Foundation to help bring more opportunities to children in the US and abroad.

In November 2011, Richie hosted Baby2Baby's charity event to support families in need during holiday season. She was a guest speaker at WE Charity's WE Day California event in 2018.

Filmography

{| class="wikitable"
|+As herself
!Year
!Title
!Role
!Notes
|-
|2002
|The Osbournes
| rowspan="13" |Herself
|-
|2003–2007
|The Simple Life'
|56 episodes; also producer
|-
|2004
|Six Feet Under|Episode: "Untitled"
|-
|2007
|America's Next Top Model 
|Episode: "The Girl Who Gets Thrown in the Pool"
|-
|2010
|Project Runway|Guest Judge; Episodes: "Reunion Special" & "Back to New York"
|-
|2012–13
|Fashion Star|Mentor; 11 episodes
|-
|2012
|The New Normal|Episode: "Para-New Normal Activity"
|-
|2014–15
|Candidly Nicole|30 episodes; also executive producer
|-
|2015
|Empire|Episode: "Et Tu, Brute?"
|-
|2015
|Barely Famous|Episode: "Barely Famous"
|-
|2016
|RuPaul's Drag Race|Episode: "Keeping It 100!"
|-
|2017
|Lip Sync Battle|Episode: "Nicole Richie vs. John Michael Higgins"
|-
|2017
|Drop the Mic|Episode: "Vanessa Hudgens vs. Michael Bennett / James Corden vs. Nicole Richie"
|-
|2020
|Making the Cut|Herself/Judge
|
|}

Music videos

Discography
 Unearthed'' (2020)

Award nominations

Published works

References

External links

Official website of The Richie-Madden Foundation

Actresses from Berkeley, California
Actresses from the San Francisco Bay Area
American actresses of Mexican descent
American adoptees
American expatriates in Australia
American film actresses
American jewelry designers
American people of Creole descent
American people of Spanish descent
American socialites
American television actresses
Lionel Richie
Living people
Musicians from Berkeley, California
Participants in American reality television series
University of Arizona alumni
Writers from Berkeley, California
1981 births
Montclair College Preparatory School alumni
Women jewellers